Austin Cedric Gibbons (March 23, 1890 – July 26, 1960) was an Irish-American art director for the film industry. He also made a significant contribution to motion picture theater architecture from the 1930s to 1950s. Gibbons designed the Oscar statuette in 1928, but tasked the sculpting to George Stanley, a Los Angeles artist. He was nominated 39 times for the Academy Award for Best Production Design and won the Oscar 11 times, both of which are records.

Early life

Cedric Gibbons was born in Ireland  in 1890 to Irish architect Austin P. Gibbons and American Veronica Fitzpatrick Simmons. The family moved to Manhattan after the birth of their third child. Cedric studied at the Art Students League of New York in 1911. He began working in his father's office as a junior draftsman, then in the art department at Edison Studios under Hugo Ballin in New Jersey in 1915. He was drafted and served in the US Navy Reserves during World War I at Pelham Bay in New York.

Career
Gibbons joined Goldwyn Studios, and began a long career with Metro-Goldwyn-Mayer in 1924, when the studio was founded.

In 1925, when he was first working in the art department at MGM, he was in competition with another talent, Romain De Tirtoff, for a more substantial position, while working with Joseph Wright, Merrill Pye and Richard Day on some 20 films. Tirtoff is better known as Erte. When studio executive Irving Thalberg summoned Gibbons to work on Ben Hur (1925), he used knowledge of the up-and-coming art moderne (that was to become known as art deco) to advance in the MGM art department.

Gibbons was one of the original 36 founding members of The Academy of Motion Picture Arts and Sciences and designed the Academy Awards statuette in 1928, a trophy for which he himself would be nominated 39 times, winning 11, the last time for Best Art Direction for Somebody Up There Likes Me (1956).

He retired from MGM as art director and the head of the art department on April 26, 1956 due to ill health with over 1,500 films credited to him; however, other designers did major work on these films, some credited, some not, during Gibbons' tenure as head of the art department. Even so, his actual hands-on art direction is considerable and his contributions lasting.

Personal life and death
In 1930, Gibbons married actress Dolores del Río and co-designed their house with Douglas Honnold in Santa Monica, an intricate Art Deco residence influenced by Rudolf Schindler. The couple divorced in 1941. In October 1944, he married actress Hazel Brooks, with whom he remained until his death.

Gibbons' niece Veronica "Rocky" Balfe was Gary Cooper's wife and briefly an actress known as Sandra Shaw.

Gibbons' second cousin Frederick "Royal" Gibbons—a musician, orchestra conductor, and entertainer who worked with him at MGM—was the father of Billy Gibbons of the rock band ZZ Top.

Despite holding a US birth certificate, Gibbons claimed on census forms that he was born in Ireland and that his family emigrated to the US during his early childhood. His press marriage announcement also stated that he was a native of Ireland. The reasons for this misstatement are unknown.

Gibbons died in Los Angeles on July 26, 1960, after a long illness, at age  70, and was buried under a modest marker, at the Calvary Cemetery, East Los Angeles. Dorothy Kilgallen, journalist and gossip columnist, a friend of his second wife, reported his age as 65 at the time of his death.

Legacy
Gibbons' set designs, particularly those in such films as Born to Dance (1936) and Rosalie (1937), heavily inspired motion picture theater architecture in the late 1930s through 1950s.

Among the classic examples are the Loma Theater in San Diego, the Crest theaters in Long Beach and Fresno, and the Culver Theater in Culver City, some of which are still extant. The style is sometimes referred to as Art Deco or as Art Moderne. The style is also found in the theaters that were managed by the Skouras brothers, whose designer Carl G. Moeller used the sweeping scroll-like details in his creations.

The iconic Oscar statuettes that Gibbons designed, which were first awarded in 1929, are still being presented to winners at Academy Awards ceremonies each year.

Gibbons was inducted into the Art Directors Guild Hall of Fame in February 2005.

Academy Awards

 Awards for Art Direction 

 The Bridge of San Luis Rey (1929)
 The Merry Widow (1934)
 Pride and Prejudice (1940)
 Blossoms in the Dust (1941)
 Gaslight (1944)
 The Yearling (1946)
 Little Women (1949)
 An American in Paris (1951)
 The Bad and the Beautiful (1952)
 Julius Caesar (1953)
 Somebody Up There Likes Me (1956)

Nominations for Art Direction

 When Ladies Meet (1933)
 Romeo and Juliet (1936)
 The Great Ziegfeld (1936)
 Conquest (1937)
 Marie Antoinette (1938)
 The Wizard of Oz (1939)
 Bitter Sweet (1940)
 When Ladies Meet (1941)
 Random Harvest (1942)
 Madame Curie (1943)
 Thousands Cheer (1943)
 Kismet (1944)
 National Velvet (1944)
 The Picture of Dorian Gray (1945)
 Madame Bovary (1949)
 The Red Danube (1949)
 Annie Get Your Gun (1950)
 Too Young to Kiss (1951)
 Quo Vadis (1951)
 The Merry Widow (1952)
 Lili (1953)
 The Story of Three Loves (1953)
 Young Bess (1953)
 Brigadoon (1954)
 Executive Suite (1954)
 I'll Cry Tomorrow (1955)
 Blackboard Jungle (1955)
 Lust for Life (1956)

See also

 Art Directors Guild Hall of Fame

Bibliography
"Cedric Gibbons Architect of Style", LA Modernism'' catalog, May 2006, pp. 16–17 by Jeffrey Head

Notes

References

External links

1890s births
1960 deaths
American art directors
American people of Irish descent
American set designers
Academy of Motion Picture Arts and Sciences founders
Best Art Direction Academy Award winners
California people in design
Art Students League of New York alumni
Burials at Calvary Cemetery (Los Angeles)